Long Pond is an unincorporated community in Monroe County in the Pocono Mountains region of Pennsylvania, a part of the Appalachian Mountains.  Long Pond is located within the Tunkhannock Creek Watershed.  Its ZIP code is 18334.

Geography
Long Pond is named after the unique wetland topography formed by the Tunkhannock Creek.   Within the Long Pond community, public access lands are owned and protected by The Bethlehem Authority, Nature Conservancy, Wildlands Conservancy  County of Monroe Open Space Program, PA Game Commission  and PA Department of Forest and Waters.  Long Pond is home to many species of unique plants and animals.

Long Pond represents the most unique inland freshwater wetland in the entire state of Pennsylvania.

The climate of Long Pond PA is variable, and ecosystems vary considerably.  Ecosystems range from glacial till barrens habitat, known for frost pockets and unique species and associated insects.  Mixed hardwood deciduous forests and vast peat bog swamps.   Frost pockets can occur in this region in typically frost free months of June, July, and August.

Tunkhannock Creek

The 17-mile Tunkhannock Creek, is a tributary of Tobyhanna Creek. Tobyhanna Creek flows into the Lehigh River, which is a major tributary to the Delaware River.  The Tunkhannock Creek basin drains approximately 32.1 square miles of the Glaciated Pocono Plateau and consists of 47.7 total stream miles.

Tunkhannock creek is designated as exceptional value waters (EV) by the PA DEP.  The National Audubon Society named the Long Pond section of the Tunkhannock Creek watershed an "Important Bird Area in Pennsylvania.

Along the creek, Leatherleaf is dominant or co-dominant with sweet-gale and the shrubs are typically one-meter high and very dense. Other low shrubs like rhodora , sheep laurel , black chokeberry , Labrador-tea , and bog laurel  are common. Tall shrubs like highbush blueberry , swamp azalea , witherod , alder , and arrow-wood  as well as red maple , red spruce , tamarack , and pitch pine saplings are scattered throughout.

Demographics
Long Pond is a sparsely populated, rural area. It has a population of about 7,000 people, and the demographics are approximately: 54.6% Caucasian/White, 26.4% African American,5% Asian, and 13% Hispanic. At $180,000 the average home value here is a bit higher than average.  The median age is 39.  The median age for men is 38 while for women the median age is 40.

Economy
Economically, Long Pond is primarily known as the location of Pocono Raceway, a track which hosts an annual NASCAR Cup Series race, the Pocono 400, in July, and other events. The track formerly hosted a second NASCAR Cup Series race, the Pocono 325, and an IndyCar race, the Pocono 500.

In July 1972 the Concert 10 rock festival brought thousands to Long Pond. Edgar Winter, Three Dog Night, the Faces featuring Rod Stewart, and others performed during the two day festival.

References

Pocono Mountains
Unincorporated communities in Monroe County, Pennsylvania
Unincorporated communities in Pennsylvania